George Peter Clare (né Georg Klaar) (21 December 1920 – 26 March 2009) was a British author and Holocaust survivor who wrote Last Waltz in Vienna and Berlin Days, both autobiographies. Last Waltz won the 1982 WH Smith Literary Award.

He was born in Vienna in 1920; his father, Ernst Klaar, was an assimilated Jewish banker.  He fought during World War II for the British Army and worked as a news editor for many years, including for Axel Springer AG. He was naturalised in 1947. He died on 26 March 2009, aged 88.

His mother was Stella Ernestyne. The Klaars were an upper class family and George claimed that they led easy lives until the war. He came from a family of doctors, his grandfather was an army surgeon and the first Jew to reach a high military rank and his grandfather was a distinguished doctor also.

In 2005 he was awarded an honorary doctorate by NUI Galway.

George was married to Lisl Beck, his childhood sweetheart, from 1939 to 1965. They had one son and two daughters. He went on to marry his Foreign News Service secretary, Christel Vorbringer in 1965. They remained married until his death.

Books
In Last Waltz in Vienna he recounts his childhood and life as a Jew in Vienna and goes on to describe Hitler's rise to power and the catastrophe that followed, including his parents' death in Auschwitz. It also tells of his escape to Ireland where he married Lisl Beck, and subsequent enlistment in the British Army, first in the Pioneer Corps and then in the Royal Artillery.

In Berlin Days he recounts his work at the denazification bureaucracy, where he became highly skilled in identifying lies and omissions in application forms.

References

External links 
 Obituary in  The Independent 1 July 2009
 Obituary in the Daily Telegraph 12 April 2009
 The Times obituary

British Jewish writers
Austrian male writers
Jewish emigrants from Austria to the United Kingdom after the Anschluss
British Zionists
Austrian Zionists
Writers from Vienna
Royal Pioneer Corps soldiers
1920 births
2009 deaths
British Army personnel of World War II
Royal Artillery soldiers